The subfamily Aphaeninae is a group of hemipteran insects, especially abundant and diverse in the tropics. They belong to the Fulgoridae (fulgorids), though they are not among the better-known members of that family that are called "lantern bugs" or "lanternflies" (although as true bugs they are only distantly related to true flies). In 2009, the first molecular analysis of the Fulgoridae challenged the existing structure of eight currently recognized subfamilies and eleven tribes.

Aphaeninae contain a number of well-sized fulgorids. If seen flying at a distance, they can be mistaken for Lepidoptera, as they are large winged and boldly patterned, although usually not as colorful as some other fulgorids.

The future of the Aphaeninae as a subfamily is unclear since the species assigned to it are interlineated in the molecular analysis with species of other Fulgoridae subfamilies.  The tribe Enchophorini, previously placed here, has been raised to a subfamily.

Tribes and genera

Tribe Aphaenini 
Auth.: Blanchard, 1847 and Distant, 1906 (distribution: worldwide tropics)
 Anecphora Karsch, 1890 (equatorial Africa)
 Aphaena Guérin-Méneville, 1834 (type genus: Asia)
 Calmar Kirkaldy, 1901 (Gambia)
 Coelodictya Jacobi, 1910 (E. Africa)
 Copidocephala Stål, 1869 (Central Americas)
 Eddara Walker, 1858 (Sub-Saharan Africa)
 Egregia Chew Kea Foo, Porion & Audibert, 2010 (Malesia)
 Holodictya Gerstaecker, 1895 (Equatorial Africa)
 Hypselometopum Stål, 1853 (Sub-Saharan Africa)
 Kalidasa Kirkaldy, 1900 (India, Indo-China)
 Limois Stål, 1863 (Asia: esp. China)
 Lycorma Stål, 1863 (Asia: incl. invasive sp.)
 Malfeytia Schmidt, 1905 (Congo basin)
 Metaphaena Schmidt, 1905 (Central Africa)
 Novodictya Lallemand, 1928 (Congo basin)
 Omalocephala Spinola, 1839 (Africa, S. India, Sri Lanka)
 Penthicodes Blanchard, 1845 (South-East Asia: esp. Indo-China & Malesia)
 Species in the "artificial, heterogenous genus" Aphaenina Metcalf, 1947 are now synonyms of Penthicodes spp.
 Prolepta Walker, 1851 (Malesia)
 Scamandra Stål, 1863 (Malesia)
 Ulasia Stål, 1863 (PNG)

Tribe Benamatapini 
Auth.: Lallemand, 1959 (central Africa)
 Benamatapa Distant, 1899

Incertae sedis
 Bhaskaraena Constant, 2016 (Malesia)
 Bloeteanella Lallemand, 1959 (PNG)
 Flatolystra Nast, 1950 (South America)
 Neoalcathous Wang & Huang, 1989 (China, Vietnam)
 Neolieftinckana Lallemand, 1963 (PNG)
 Saramel Fennah, 1977 (PNG)

Genera formerly placed here
 Hellerides Lallemand, 1963 is a junior synonym of Zophiuma Fennah, 1955 in the Lophopidae.
The following PNG/Australian genera were previously placed here, but are now in the Poiocerinae: tribe Poiocerini Haupt, 1929:
 Desudaba Walker, 1858 (formerly in the tribe Aphaenini Schmidt, 1912)
 Erilla Distant, 1906 (formerly in the tribe Limoisini Lallemand, 1963) 
 Galela Distant, 1906 (formerly in the tribe Aphaenini Schmidt, 1912)
 The type species of genus Apossoda, A. togoensis Schmidt, 1911, is now placed in Pyrgoteles: P. togoensis (Schmidt, 1911)

Adverse effects
The spotted lantern fly is an invasive species in the United States and can devastate vineyards and ruin fruit crops. It feeds on a variety of crops, and the waste it excretes encourages a fungal growth called sooty mold which can kill plants by blocking sunlight from reaching their leaves. In September 2021 a boy included one of these rare and dangerous insects in his bug collection at the Kansas State Fair, triggering a federal investigation because the lanternfly had previously not been found farther west than southeastern Indiana.

References

External links

FLOW: Aphaeninae

 
Hemiptera subfamilies